This article refers to crime in the U.S. state of Vermont. Vermont is the safest state in the country with a violent crime rate of 118 incidents per 100,000 state residents.

State statistics
In 2011 there were 16,011 crimes reported in Vermont, including 11 murders. In 2014 there were 10,173 crimes reported, including 10 murders.

From 2000 to 2013, the state experienced a 77% increase in treatment for all opiates. About 80% of all inmates are either addicted or in prison because of their addiction.

Capital punishment laws

Capital punishment is no longer applied in the state.

See also
 Vermont Department of Corrections

References